Samuele Battistella (born 14 November 1998) is an Italian cyclist, who currently rides for UCI WorldTeam . Battistella's first professional win was at the 2021 Veneto Classic. He was initially named to the Astana team for the 2022 Tour de France, but was diagnosed with COVID-19 right before the race. He instead rode at the 2022 Vuelta a España.

Major results

2016
 1st Trofeo Buffoni
 3rd Overall Giro della Lunigiana
 5th Road race, UEC European Junior Road Championships
 5th Montichiari–Roncone
 6th Trofeo Guido Dorigo
 7th Trofeo Citta di Loano
2018
 2nd Overall Grand Prix Priessnitz spa
1st  Points classification
1st Stage 1
 3rd Gran Premio Sportivi di Poggiana
 4th Giro del Belvedere
 6th Trofeo Città di San Vendemiano
 6th Giro del Medio Brenta
 8th Trofeo Edil C
2019
 1st  Road race, UCI Road World Under-23 Championships
 1st  Overall Tour de Limpopo
1st  Mountains classification
1st  Young rider classification
1st Stage 3
 1st Giro del Belvedere
 2nd G.P. Palio del Recioto
 6th Trofeo Piva
2021
 1st Veneto Classic
 4th Overall Arctic Race of Norway
 4th Coppa Bernocchi
 6th Trofeo Matteotti
 10th Giro della Toscana
2022
 3rd Overall Tour de Hongrie
 3rd Road race, National Road Championships
 5th Prueba Villafranca de Ordizia
 7th Overall Tour de Pologne
 7th Overall Tour de la Provence
  Combativity award Stage 12 Vuelta a España

Grand Tour general classification results timeline

References

External links

1998 births
Living people
Italian male cyclists
People from Castelfranco Veneto
Competitors at the 2018 Mediterranean Games
Mediterranean Games competitors for Italy
Cyclists from the Province of Treviso
21st-century Italian people